Luis Barceló Jover (1896 – 15 March 1939) was a Spanish military officer.

Spanish Civil War
A professional officer of the Spanish Army, he supported the Republican government during the Spanish Civil War. In 1936 he was a major of the Spanish army. In July 1936, he was one of the officers who set up summary courts to try the rebel officers captured after the failure of the coup in Madrid. In September 1936, he took part in the Siege of the Alcazar. Later, he joined the Communist Party of Spain and led one mixed brigade of Juan Modesto's division in the Second Battle of the Corunna Road. Later, he was promoted to colonel and in June 1937, he became one of the Republican commanders in the Segovia Offensive. In 1939, he was the commander of the I Corps of the Republican Army of the Centre.

Casado coup and execution
On March 5, 1939, the Colonel Segismundo Casado, an officer of the Republican Army, supported a section of the PSOE (Julian Besteiro), a section of the UGT (Wenceslao Carrillo), the CNT (Cipriano Mera), the general Manuel Matallana and the secret service of the Republic (SIM), staged a coup, deposed the prime minister, Juan Negrín, and established the National Defence Council (Consejo Nacional de Defensa) to start peace negotiations with Francisco Franco. The Council dismissed the communist commanders of the I, II, and III Corps of the Army of the Centre, such as Barceló, but he rejected the authority of the Council, and on March 7, he appointed himself as Commander of the Army of the Centre, set up his headquarters in the Pardo Palace and entered with his troops in Madrid, supported by the Bueno's II Corps and the Ortega's III Corps, starting a brief civil war inside the Republic. After days of bloody combat, he was defeated by Cipriano Mera's IV Corps and surrendered himself to the Council on March 12. On March 13, he and his commissar, José Conesa, were sentenced to death by a military tribunal and executed.

References

Sources
Beevor, Antony. (2006). The battle for Spain. The Spanish Civil war, 1936–1939. Penguin Books. London. .
Preston, Paul. (1995). Franco. Fontana Press. London. .
Preston, Paul. (2006). The Spanish Civil War. Reaction, Revolution & Revenge. Harper Perennial. London. . .
Thomas, Hugh. The Spanish Civil War. Penguin Books. 2001. London. 

1896 births
1939 deaths
Military personnel from Madrid
Spanish army officers
Communist Party of Spain politicians
Spanish communists
Unión Militar Republicana Antifascista members
Spanish military personnel of the Spanish Civil War (Republican faction)
Executed Spanish people
People executed by Spain by firing squad